The following outline is provided as an overview of and topical guide to the U.S. state of Wyoming:

Wyoming – U.S. state in the mountain region of the Western United States.  The western two thirds of the state is covered mostly with the mountain ranges and rangelands in the foothills of the Eastern Rocky Mountains, while the eastern third of the state is high elevation prairie known as the High Plains. Wyoming is the least populous U.S. state, with a U.S. Census population of 563,626 in 2010.

General reference 

 Names
 Common name: Wyoming
 Pronunciation: 
 Official name: State of Wyoming
 Abbreviations and name codes
 Postal symbol:  WY
 ISO 3166-2 code: US-WY
 Internet second-level domain: .wy.us
 Nicknames
 Cowboy State
 Equality State
 Park State
 Forever West (On highway welcome signs)
 Adjectival: Wyoming
 Demonym: Wyomingite

Geography of Wyoming 

Geography of Wyoming
 Wyoming is: a U.S. state, a federal state of the United States of America
 Location
 Northern hemisphere
 Western hemisphere
 Americas
 North America
 Anglo America
 Northern America
 United States of America
 Contiguous United States
 Western United States
 Mountain West United States
 Northwestern United States
 Population of Wyoming: 563,626  (2010 U.S. Census)
 Area of Wyoming:
 Atlas of Wyoming

Places in Wyoming 

 Historic places in Wyoming
 National Historic Landmarks in Wyoming
 National Register of Historic Places listings in Wyoming
 Bridges on the National Register of Historic Places in Wyoming
 National Natural Landmarks in Wyoming
 National parks in Wyoming
 State parks in Wyoming

Environment of Wyoming 

Environment of Wyoming
 Climate of Wyoming
 Geology of Wyoming
Volcanism of Wyoming
 Superfund sites in Wyoming
 Wildlife of Wyoming
 Fauna of Wyoming
 Birds of Wyoming
 Mammals of Wyoming

Natural geographic features of Wyoming 

 Rivers of Wyoming

Regions of Wyoming

Administrative divisions of Wyoming 

 The 23 counties of the state of Wyoming
 Municipalities in Wyoming
 Cities in Wyoming
 State capital of Wyoming: Cheyenne
 Largest city in Wyoming: Cheyenne
 City nicknames in Wyoming
 Unincorporated communities in Wyoming
 Census-designated places in Wyoming

Demography of Wyoming 

Demographics of Wyoming

Government and politics of Wyoming 

Politics of Wyoming
 Form of government: U.S. state government
 United States congressional delegations from Wyoming
 Wyoming State Capitol
 Elections in Wyoming
 Electoral reform in Wyoming
 Political party strength in Wyoming

Branches of the government of Wyoming 

Government of Wyoming

Executive branch of the government of Wyoming 
Governor of Wyoming
Lieutenant Governor of Wyoming
 Secretary of State of Wyoming
 State departments
 Wyoming Department of Transportation

Legislative branch of the government of Wyoming 

 Wyoming Legislature (bicameral)
 Upper house: Wyoming Senate
 Lower house: Wyoming House of Representatives

Judicial branch of the government of Wyoming 

Courts of Wyoming
 Supreme Court of Wyoming

Law and order in Wyoming 

Law of Wyoming
 Adoption in Wyoming
 Cannabis in Wyoming
 Capital punishment in Wyoming
 Individuals executed in Wyoming
 Constitution of Wyoming
 Crime in Wyoming
 Organized crime in Wyoming
 Gun laws in Wyoming
 Law enforcement in Wyoming
 Law enforcement agencies in Wyoming
 Wyoming Highway Patrol
 Prisons in Wyoming
 Same-sex marriage in Wyoming

Military in Wyoming 

Wyoming Military Department
 Wyoming Air National Guard
 Wyoming Army National Guard

History of Wyoming 

History of Wyoming

History of Wyoming, by period 
Prehistory of Wyoming
Indigenous peoples
French colony of Louisiane east of Continental Divide, 1699–1764
Treaty of Fontainebleau of 1762
Spanish (though predominantly Francophone) district of Alta Luisiana east of Continental Divide, 1764–1803
Third Treaty of San Ildefonso of 1800
French district of Haute-Louisiane east of Continental Divide, 1803
Louisiana Purchase of 1803
Unorganized U.S. territory created by the Louisiana Purchase east of Continental Divide, 1803–1804
District of Louisiana east of Continental Divide, 1804–1805
Territory of Louisiana east of Continental Divide, 1805–1812
Territory of Missouri east of Continental Divide, 1812–1821
War of 1812, June 18, 1812 – March 23, 1815
Treaty of Ghent, December 24, 1814
Oregon Country west of Continental Divide, 1818–1846
Anglo-American Convention of 1818
Oregon Trail, 1841–1869
California Trail, 1841–1869
Provisional Government of Oregon, 1843–1848
Oregon Treaty of 1846
Spanish colony of Santa Fé de Nuevo Méjico south of the 42nd parallel north and west of 106°10'42"W, 1598-(1819–1821)
Adams–Onís Treaty of 1819
Treaty of Córdoba of 1821
Unorganized Territory east of Continental Divide, 1821–1854
Treaty of Fort Laramie of 1851
Mexican territory of Santa Fé de Nuevo México south of the 42nd parallel north and west of 106°10'42"W, 1821–1846
Territorial claims of the Republic of Texas south of the 42nd parallel north between 106°10'42"W and 107°23'33"W, 1836–1845
Mexican–American War, April 25, 1846 – February 2, 1848
Mormon Trail, 1847–1869
Treaty of Guadalupe Hidalgo, February 2, 1848
Territory of Oregon, 1848–1859
State of Deseret (extralegal), 1849–1850
Territory of Utah, (1850–1868)-1896
Territory of Washington, 1853-(1859–1863)-1889
Territory of Nebraska, (1854–1863)-1867
Pony Express, 1860–1861
American Civil War, April 12, 1861 – May 13, 1865
First Transcontinental Telegraph completed 1861
Territory of Jefferson (extralegal), 1859–1861
Territory of Dakota, 1861-(1864–1868)-1889
Red Cloud's War, 1866–1868
Territory of Idaho, (1863–1868)-1890
Territory of Wyoming, 1868–1890
Treaty of Fort Laramie of 1868
History of women's suffrage in Wyoming since 1869
First transcontinental railroad completed 1869
Powell Geographic Expedition of 1869
Yellowstone National Park designated first United States National Park on March 1, 1872
Nez Perce War, 1877
State of Wyoming becomes 44th state admitted to the United States of America on July 10, 1890
Grand Teton National Park established on February 26, 1929

History of Wyoming, by subject 
 Territorial evolution of Wyoming
 Uranium mining in Wyoming

Culture of Wyoming 

Culture of Wyoming
 Museums in Wyoming
 Religion in Wyoming
 The Church of Jesus Christ of Latter-day Saints in Wyoming
 Episcopal Diocese of Wyoming
 Scouting in Wyoming
 State symbols of Wyoming
 Flag of the state of Wyoming 
 Great Seal of the State of Wyoming

The arts in Wyoming 
 Music of Wyoming

Sports in Wyoming 

Sports in Wyoming

Economy and infrastructure of Wyoming 

Economy of Wyoming
 Communications in Wyoming
 Newspapers in Wyoming
 Radio stations in Wyoming
 Television stations in Wyoming
 Energy in Wyoming
 Power stations in Wyoming
 Solar power in Wyoming
 Wind power in Wyoming
 Health care in Wyoming
 Hospitals in Wyoming
 Mining in Wyoming
 Coal mining in Wyoming
 Uranium mining in Wyoming
 Transportation in Wyoming
 Airports in Wyoming
 Roads in Wyoming
 State highways in Wyoming

Education in Wyoming 

Education in Wyoming
 Schools in Wyoming
 School districts in Wyoming
 High schools in Wyoming
 Colleges and universities in Wyoming
 University of Wyoming
Wyoming Catholic College

See also

Topic overview:
Wyoming

Index of Wyoming-related articles

References

External links 

Wyoming
Wyoming
 1